Dłużek-Kolonia  is a settlement in the administrative district of Gmina Lubsko, within Żary County, Lubusz Voivodeship, in western Poland.

References

Villages in Żary County